Taldysay (Taldysai) is a small town in Kobda District in Aktobe Region of western Kazakhstan. It lies along the R-76 road, west of Komsomol'skoe.

References

Populated places in Aktobe Region